Tyler Moore may refer to:
Tyler Moore (baseball) (born 1987), American baseball player
Tyler Moore (American football) (born 1993), American football player
Tyler Moore (powerlifter) (born 1993), American powerlifter
Tyler Jacob Moore (born 1982), American actor
Tyler Moore (sailor), sailor who won gold in the 1999 Farr 30 World Championship

See also
Mary Tyler Moore (1936–2017), American actress